Traian Iordache (10 October 1911 – 3 April 1999) was a Romanian football striker and coach.

Honours

Club
Venus București
Liga I (2): 1938–39, 1939–40

Individual
Total matches played in Romanian First League: 93 matches – 66 goals
Topscorer of Romanian First League: 1936–37

References

External links
 
 

1911 births
1999 deaths
Footballers from Bucharest
Romanian footballers
Unirea Tricolor București players
Venus București players
FC Carmen București players
Romania international footballers
Liga I players
Association football forwards
Romanian football managers
FCV Farul Constanța managers